Mikhail Elgin and Denis Istomin were the defending champions but lost in the first round to James Cerretani and Marc Polmans.

Hans Podlipnik-Castillo and Andrei Vasilevski won the title after defeating Yuki Bhambri and Divij Sharan 6–4, 6–2 in the final.

Seeds

Draw

References
 Main Draw

Tashkent Challenger - Doubles
2017 Doubles